John Russell Hind FRS FRSE LLD (12 May 1823 – 23 December 1895) was an English astronomer.

Life and work 

John Russell Hind was born in 1823 in Nottingham, the son of lace manufacturer John Hind and Elizabeth Russell, and was educated at Nottingham High School. At age 17 he went to London to serve an apprenticeship as a civil engineer, but through the help of Charles Wheatstone he left engineering to accept a position at the Royal Observatory, Greenwich under George Biddell Airy.
Hind remained there from 1840 to 1844, at which time he succeeded W. R. Dawes as director of the private George Bishop's Observatory. In 1853 Hind became Superintendent of the Nautical Almanac, a position he held until 1891.

Hind is notable for being one of the early discoverers of asteroids.  He also discovered and observed the variable stars R Leporis (also known as Hind's Crimson Star), U Geminorum, and T Tauri (also called Hind's Variable Nebula), and discovered the variability of μ Cephei. Hind discovered Nova Ophiuchi 1848 (V841 Ophiuchi), the first object of its type discovered since 1670.

Hind's naming of the asteroid 12 Victoria caused some controversy. At the time, asteroids were not supposed to be named after living persons. Hind somewhat disingenuously claimed that the name was not a reference to Queen Victoria, but the mythological figure Victoria.

He was elected a Fellow of the Royal Society in June 1863 and President of the Royal Astronomical Society in 1880.

He died in 1895 in Twickenham, London. Hind had married Fanny Fuller in 1846; he and his wife had six children.

Honours and legacy 

 Gold Medal of the Royal Astronomical Society (1853)
 Fellow of the Royal Society (1863)
 The crater Hind on the Moon
 Asteroid 1897 Hind.  Details: 
 Comets C/1847 C1 (Hind) and C/1846 O1 (de Vico-Hind).  See also Comet Hind
 Hind's Crimson Star – The red-giant variable star R Leporis
 Hind's Variable Nebula – A reflection nebula in Taurus, also known as NGC 1555, associated with the young, irregular variable star T Tauri.

Notes
Some sources give his name as John Russel Hind with only one "L". However, civil records and 19th century British astronomical magazines consistently spell his name with two "L"s.

In the table of discovered asteroids, mpc links to the Minor Planet Center database for more information about the asteroid, along with the background on its name.

References

Further reading 
 
 Book: Observing and Cataloguing Nebulae and Star Clusters By Steinicke, Page 121 Biography of Hind.
 Book: Everyday Biography: Containing a Collection of Brief Biographies Arranged ..., Page 120 very short bio
 University of Glasgow, Graduate Record
 Lists Hind's accomplishments and related info

External links 

 – also known as T Tauri

1823 births
1895 deaths
People from Nottingham
19th-century British astronomers
Discoverers of asteroids
Discoverers of comets
Recipients of the Gold Medal of the Royal Astronomical Society
Royal Medal winners
Fellows of the Royal Society
Corresponding members of the Saint Petersburg Academy of Sciences
Presidents of the Royal Astronomical Society
Recipients of the Lalande Prize